Cold Spring Tavern was established as a stagecoach stop in 1865. Originally known as the "Cold Spring Relay Station", it was a horse changeover and meals break station. The tavern is located 20 minutes north of Santa Barbara, California, in Cold Spring Canyon, which is about a mile off Highway 154 along Stagecoach Road (in the San Marcos Pass area).

The tavern serves steak, lamb, venison, duck, and rabbit.

Recognition

The tavern was chosen as the BEST place for a Romantic Getaway and The Santa Barbara Independent called it "pure MAGIC!" They have been noted as one of the few (if not only) restaurants serving bear.

In 2019 it was featured in a Santa Barbara episode of the Cooking Channel's Man v. Food.

See also
Cold Spring Canyon Arch Bridge
Santa Ynez Valley

References

External links
 Official site

Landmarks in California
Restaurants in California
Buildings and structures in Santa Barbara County, California
Restaurants established in 1865
Tourist attractions in Santa Barbara County, California
1865 establishments in California